Thimmamma Marrimanu (Telugu: తిమ్మమ్మ మర్రిమాను, lit. "Thimmamma's Banyan Tree") is a banyan tree in Anantapur, located about 25 kilometers from Kadiri, Andhra Pradesh, India. It is probably a specimen of Ficus benghalensis. In the Telugu language, "" denotes "banyan" and "" denotes "trunk". The tree is revered by the people of Dharmic religions alike, namely, Hinduism, Buddhism, Jainism, and Sikhism.

Legend 

According to a local myth, the tree is named after Thimmamma, a woman who committed sati (suicide by throwing herself on the funeral pyre of her husband's dead body). The tree is said to have originated from one of the poles used in the funeral pyre.

Religious significance 

The great banyan tree is revered by the people of Indian-origin religions such as Hinduism (including Vedic, Shaivism, Dravidian Hinduism), Buddhism, Jainism, and Sikhism. A small temple dedicated to Thimmamma is beneath the tree. The residents of the region strongly believe that if a childless couple worships Thimmamma they will beget a child in the next year. A large jatara is conducted at Thimmamma on the day of the Shivaratri festival, when thousands flock to the tree to worship it.

Recordation 
The tree was first noticed and revealed to the world by Regret Iyer (Sathyanarayana Iyer), a freelance journalist and photographer from Bangalore, Karnataka, India, who made all efforts to have the tree recorded in the Guinness Book of World Records as "World's largest Banyan Tree" in the 1989 edition.

Thimmamma Marrimanu was discussed in the second segment of the BBC series 'The Tree Spirits' (29 August 2017).

See also
 List of Banyan trees in India
 List of individual trees

References

Trees of India
Individual banyan trees
Individual trees in India
11."SreeVeeraiahNayakunicharitra"(Thimmammamarrimanu kata)was written and published by Dr. S. S. GiridharaprasadRoy,with the assistance by the Pottisreeramulu Telugu  University Hyderabad in the year1989,the same story was translated and published by the same author with the title"The story of Thimmammamarrimanu "in the year 2012